Luca Rovinalti (born 4 January 1987) is an Italian journalist, who has been executive director at the International Press Club of Prague since 2013.

Life 
Rovinalti was born in Modena and brought up in the city of Milan; he is working as foreign correspondent for several medias in central-eastern Europe and has experience in the area of international and diplomatic relations.
He has been actively involved in the EU-China Economics & Politics institute as head of their Brussels Liaison Point.

Notes 
 List of accredited foreign correspondents MFA CR
 Jury of Febio Fest, International Film Festival
 List of accredited journalists for the KHL Season 2013-14

References

External links 
 European Federalist Party Czech Republic Website
 International Press Club of Prague Website

1987 births
Italian journalists
Italian male journalists
Italian businesspeople
Living people